Maṇḍala is a Sanskrit word meaning 'circle'. The mandala is a model for describing the patterns of diffuse political power distributed among Mueang or Kedatuan (principalities) in medieval Southeast Asian history, when local power was more important than the central leadership. The concept of the mandala balances modern tendencies to look for unified political power, eg. the power of large kingdoms and nation states of later history – an inadvertent byproduct of 15th century advances in map-making technologies.  In the words of O. W. Wolters who further explored the idea in 1982:

The map of earlier Southeast Asia which evolved from the prehistoric networks of small settlements and reveals itself in historical records was a patchwork of often overlapping mandalas.

It is employed to denote traditional Southeast Asian political formations, such as federation of  kingdoms or vassalized polity under a center of domination. It was adopted by 20th century European historians from ancient Indian political discourse as a means of avoiding the term "state" in the conventional sense. Not only did Southeast Asian polities except Vietnam not conform to Chinese and European views of a territorially defined state with fixed borders and a bureaucratic apparatus, but they diverged considerably in the opposite direction: the polity was defined by its centre rather than its boundaries, and it could be composed of numerous other tributary polities without undergoing administrative integration.

In some ways similar to the feudal system of Europe, states were linked in suzerain–tributary relationships.

Terminology
The term draws a comparison with the mandala of the Hindu and Buddhist worldview; the comparison emphasises the radiation of power from each power center, as well as the non-physical basis of the system.

Other metaphors such as S. J. Tambiah's original idea of a "galactic polity" describe political patterns similar to the mandala. The historian Victor Lieberman prefers the "solar polity" metaphor, referencing the gravitational pull the sun exerts over the planets.

History
 

Historically, the main suzerain or overlord states were the Khmer Empire of Cambodia; Srivijaya of South Sumatra; the successive kingdoms of Mataram, Kediri, Singhasari and Majapahit of Java; the Ayutthaya Kingdom of Thailand; Champa and early Đại Việt. China occupies a special place in that the others often in turn paid tribute to China, although in practice the obligations imposed on the lesser kingdoms were minimal. The most notable tributary states were post-Angkor Cambodia, Lan Xang (succeeded by the Kingdom of Vientiane and Luang Prabang) and Lanna. Cambodia in the 18th century was described by the Vietnamese emperor Gia Long as "an independent country that is slave of two" (Chandler p. 119). The system was eventually ended by the arrival of the Europeans in the mid-19th century. Culturally, they introduced Western geographical practices, which assumed that every area was subject to one sovereign. Practically, the colonisation of French Indochina, Dutch East Indies, British Malaya and Burma brought pressure from the colonisers for fixed boundaries to their possessions. The tributary states were then divided between the colonies and Siam, which exercised much more centralised power but over a smaller area than thitherto.

The advent of Islam in the archipelago saw the application of this system which is still continued in the formation of the government, such as the formation of the 18th century Negeri Sembilan coalition which focused on Seri Menanti as a center flanked by four inner luak serambi and four outer districts. Another example is the post-Majapahit Islamic kingdoms in Java.

Historian Martin Stuart-Fox uses the term "mandala" extensively to describe the history of the Lao kingdom of Lan Xang as a structure of loosely held together mueang that disintegrated after Lan Xang's conquest by Thailand starting in the 18th century.

Thai historian Sunait Chutintaranond made an important contribution to study of the mandala in Southeast Asian history by demonstrating that "three assumptions responsible for the view that Ayudhya was a strong centralized state" did not hold and that "in Ayudhya the hegemony of provincial governors was never successfully eliminated."

Obligations

The obligations on each side of the relationship varied according to the strength of the relationship and the circumstances. In general, the tributary was obliged to pay bunga mas, a regular tribute of various valuable goods and slaves, and miniature trees of gold and silver (bunga mas dan perak). The overlord ruler reciprocated with presents often of greater value than those supplied by the tributary. However, the tributary also had to provide men and supplies when called on, most often in time of war. The main benefit to the tributary was protection from invasion by other powers, although as South East Asia historian Thongchai Winichakul notes, this was often "mafia-like protection" from the threats of the overlord himself. In some cases, the overlord also controlled the succession in the tributary, but in general interference with the tributary's domestic affairs was minimal: he would retain his own army and powers of taxation, for example. In the case of the more tenuous relationships, the "overlord" might regard it as one of tribute, while the "tributary" might consider the exchange of gifts to be purely commercial or as an expression of goodwill (Thongchai p. 87).

Personal relationships

The emphasis on personal relationships was one of the defining characteristics of the mandala system. The tributary ruler was subordinate to the overlord ruler, rather than to the overlord state in the abstract. This had many important implications. A strong ruler could attract new tributaries, and would have strong relationships over his existing tributaries. A weaker ruler would find it harder to attract and maintain these relationships. This was put forward as one cause of the sudden rise of Sukhothai under Ramkhamhaeng, for example, and for its almost equally steep decline after his death (Wyatt, 45 and 48). The tributary ruler could repudiate the relationship and seek either a different overlord or complete independence.   The system was non-territorial. The overlord was owed allegiance by the tributary ruler, or at most by the tributary's main town, but not by all the people of a particular area. The tributary owner in turn had power either over tributary states further down the scale, or directly over "his" people, wherever they lived. No ruler had authority over unpopulated areas.

The personal relationship between overlord and subordinate rulers is also defining the dynamic of relationship within a mandala. The relations between Dharmasetu of Srivijaya and Samaratungga of Sailendra for instance, defining the succession of these dynastic family. Dharmasetu was the Srivijayan Maharaja overlord, while the house of Sailendra in Java is suggested to be related and was subscribed to Srivijayan mandala domination. After Samaratungga married Princess Tara, the daughter of Dharmasetu, Samaratungga became his successor and the house of Sailendra was promoted to become the dynastic lineage of later Srivijayan kings, and for a century the center of Srivijaya was shifted from Sumatra to Java.

Non-exclusivity
The overlord-tributary relationship was not necessarily exclusive. A state in border areas might pay tribute to two or three stronger powers. The tributary ruler could then play the stronger powers against one another to minimize interference by either one, while for the major powers the tributaries served as a buffer zone to prevent direct conflict between them. For example, the Malay kingdoms in Malay Peninsula, Langkasuka and Tambralinga earlier were subject to Srivijayan mandala, and in later periods contested by both Ayutthaya mandala in the north and Majapahit mandala in the south, before finally gaining its own gravity during Malacca Sultanate.

See also

 Indianisation - mandalas led to Indianisation of Southeast Asia
 Chakravartin - universal ruler
 Devaraja - Hindu-Buddhist concept of deified royalty in Southeast Asia
 Greater India - mandalas were key components
 History of Indian influence on Southeast Asia - expansion of Indianised mandalas
 Indian influences in early Philippine polities - mandalas of Srivijaya empire
 Indian maritime history - responsible for spread of mandalas 
 Indosphere - term mandalas originated from Sanskrit
 Monthon - Siamese system of local administration from 1897 to 1933
 Rajamandala - "circle of states" in India from 4th century BC to 2nd century AD

 Similar models elsewhere
 Chiefdom
 Fealty – European analogue
 Hegemony - similar European concept
 Homage (feudal) - similar European system
 Honour (feudal barony) - similar 11th and 12th centuries European system
 Metropole - a term for the centre of British Empire
 Tusi – system of local chiefdoms in southern China 

 General 
 Palace economy - centralized administration methods in antiquity
 Political geography - impact of geography on the politics
 Sacred king - position of kingship carries a sacred meaning
 Sphere of influence
 Suzerainty – allowing limited self-rule 
 Zomia (geography) - a term used for those on the periphery

Notes

Additional references
Chandler, David.  A History of Cambodia.   Westview Press, 1983. 
 
 Lieberman, Victor, Strange Parallels: Southeast Asia in Global Context, c. 800-1830, Volume 1: Integration on the Mainland, Cambridge University Press, 2003.
 Stuart-Fox, Martin, The Lao Kingdom of Lan Xang: Rise and Decline, White Lotus, 1998.
 Tambiah, S. J., World Conqueror and World Renouncer, Cambridge, 1976.
Thongchai Winichakul.  Siam Mapped.   University of Hawaii Press, 1994. 
Wolters, O.W. History, Culture and Region in Southeast Asian Perspectives. Institute of Southeast Asian Studies, 1982. 
Wolters, O.W. History, Culture and Region in Southeast Asian Perspectives. Institute of Southeast Asian Studies, Revised Edition, 1999.
Wyatt, David.  Thailand: A Short History (2nd edition).  Yale University Press, 2003.

Further reading
Political reasons for survey and map making in Siam detailed in 
 
 
 

Cultural assimilation
Diplomacy
Globalization
Feudalism in Asia
History of Southeast Asia
Indianized kingdoms
Political geography
Political theories
Power (social and political) theories 
Sanskrit words and phrases